The Silverton Tramway A class was a class of 4-6-0 steam locomotives operated by the Silverton Tramway Company.

History
The Silverton Tramway Company took delivery of two 4-6-0 locomotives in 1912 from Beyer, Peacock & Co, Manchester followed by another two in 1915.

They were built with small tenders so as to keep them within the limits imposed by the fifty foot turntables and operated both passenger and freight services on the Silverton Tramway. Between 1924 and 1926, all were fitted with superheaters.

After the arrival of the W class in 1951, they were relegated to trip working between the various mines in Broken Hill. During World War II and again in the 1950s, they were leased to the South Australian Railways for shunting duties at Peterborough. The last was withdrawn in January 1961.

A21 has been preserved at the National Railway Museum, Port Adelaide.

Class list

References

Beyer, Peacock locomotives
Railway locomotives introduced in 1912
Silverton Tramway
Steam locomotives of New South Wales
3 ft 6 in gauge locomotives of Australia
4-6-0 locomotives